Robine Rijke (born 1 September 1996) is a Dutch cricketer. She played for the Netherlands women's national cricket team in the 2015 ICC Women's World Twenty20 Qualifier in November 2015.

In June 2018, she was named in the Netherlands' squad for the 2018 ICC Women's World Twenty20 Qualifier tournament. She made her Women's Twenty20 International (WT20I) for the Netherlands against United Arab Emirates in the World Twenty20 Qualifier on 7 July 2018. However, two days later she was suspended from bowling in international matches, after her bowling action was deemed to be illegal.

In May 2019, she was named in Netherlands' squad for the 2019 ICC Women's Qualifier Europe tournament in Spain. In August 2019, she was named in the Dutch squad for the 2019 ICC Women's World Twenty20 Qualifier tournament in Scotland. However, on 31 August 2019, the International Cricket Council (ICC) announced that her bowling action was illegal, and she was suspended from bowling in international cricket matches. In November 2021, the ICC declared that Rijke's action was now legal following a re-assessment.

In October 2021, she was named in the Dutch team for the 2021 Women's Cricket World Cup Qualifier tournament in Zimbabwe.

References

External links
 

1996 births
Living people
Dutch women cricketers
Netherlands women One Day International cricketers
Netherlands women Twenty20 International cricketers
Sportspeople from The Hague
20th-century Dutch women
20th-century Dutch people
21st-century Dutch women